Sarah K. Peake is an American politician from the Commonwealth of Massachusetts. A Democrat, she has served in the Massachusetts House of Representatives since 2007.  She represents the Fourth Barnstable district, a Cape Cod district that includes her hometown of Provincetown. She previously served on the Provincetown Board of Selectmen.

Peake earned an A.B. from Colgate University and a Juris Doctor from Pace University School of Law.

Elected to the Provincetown Board of Selectmen in 2002, she first ran for state representative in 2004, facing Republican incumbent Shirley Gomes. Gomes, running for a sixth term, defeated Peake by 55 percent to 42 percent. When Gomes decided against seeking re-election in 2006, Peake once again ran for the seat. She won the Democratic primary handily against two opponents. In the general election, she faced Republican Aaron Maloy and won by 56 percent to 44 percent. She took office the following January. Seeking a second term in November 2008, she faced former Harwich selectman and Republican nominee Don Howell. She won easily, defeating Howell by 68% to 32%. In 2010, she overcame Orleans selectman and Republican nominee David Dunford, winning 64% of the vote.

In the legislature, she serves as the Vice-Chair of the Joint Committee on Tourism, Arts and Cultural Development, as well as being a member of the House Committee on Post Audit and Oversight and the House Committee on Bonding, Capital Expenditures and State Assets.

Peake is married to Lynn Mogell. She is one of five openly LGBT members of the Massachusetts General Court, alongside Representatives Kate Hogan (D–Stow), Liz Malia (D–Jamaica Plain) and Denise Andrews (D–Orange), as well as Senator Stan Rosenberg (D–Amherst). Her 2006, 2008 and 2010 campaigns won the support of the Gay & Lesbian Victory Fund.

See also
 2019–2020 Massachusetts legislature
 2021–2022 Massachusetts legislature

References

External links
Legislative homepage
Campaign website

Democratic Party members of the Massachusetts House of Representatives
Living people
Lesbian politicians
LGBT state legislators in Massachusetts
Colgate University alumni
Pace University alumni
Women state legislators in Massachusetts
People from Provincetown, Massachusetts
21st-century American politicians
21st-century American women politicians
1957 births